Knut Birgersson (Old Norse: Knútr jarl Birgisson, died 1208) was Riksjarl of Sweden. He was the eldest surviving son of Riksjarl Birger Brosa and a member of the powerful House of Bjälbo also known as the House of Folkung  (Folkungaätten).

Biography
Knut Birgersson was apparently elevated to the office of Riksjarl during the last years of the reign of King Sverker II of Sweden. This was despite the fact that Sverker had named his infant son Johan Sverkersson (c. 1201– 1222) as riksjarl following the death of Jarl Birger Brosa. Johan Sverkersson was the  nephew of Knut Birgersson, being born of his sister Ingegärd Birgersdotter.

According to one source, Jarl Knut was married to daughter of King Canute I of Sweden, named Sigrid Knutsdotter. The same source states that Knut's son  Magnus Broka of Bjälboätten  was born of Sigrid.   Knut Birgersson was killed  in 1208 at the Battle of Lena, where King Sverker lost his throne to the new king Eric X of Sweden (Erik Knutsson), the only remaining son of King Canute.

References

Other sources
 Harrison, Dick (2002) Jarlens sekel (Ordfront förlag, Stockholm)  

1208 deaths
13th-century Swedish nobility
Year of birth unknown
Swedish jarls